Sean Cashman (born September 9, 1987) in an American professional baseball coach in the Texas Rangers organization and former college baseball coach. He was the head coach of the Saint Peter's Peacocks during the 2013 season.

Born in Toms River, New Jersey, Cashman graduated from Toms River High School North.

College career
Cashman was a pitcher for Saint Peter's.  After his playing days, he worked as a scout and eventually turned to coaching, serving as an assistant at Ocean County College for one season.  He then moved to Temple for two seasons, before landing the top assistant position at Saint Peter's for one season.  After serving as recruiting coordinator and pitching coach, he was elevated to the top job.  After the 2013 season, Cashman was shot in the leg during an attempted robbery on campus. Cashman was on leave for the 2014 season, during which T. J. Baxter served as acting head coach; Baxter replaced him permanently following the season.

Head coaching record
This table shows Cashman's record as a head coach at the Division I level.

Amateur baseball
After leaving St. Peters', Cashman worked in amateur baseball. Among his jobs included serving as a head coach and general manager in the Atlantic Collegiate Baseball League, and two years as a pitching coach in the Perfect Game Collegiate Baseball League. He served as an assistant and third base coach for the Wisconsin Rapids Rafters of the Northwoods League in 2018.

Professional baseball
Prior to the 2019 season, Cashman was hired by the Texas Rangers as a minor league pitching coach. He served as a pitching coach for the 2019 AZL Rangers. Cashman was named the manager of the Spokane Indians prior to the 2020 season.

References

External links
Spokane Indians announce new manager Sean Cashman

1987 births
Living people
Sportspeople from Toms River, New Jersey 
Baseball players from New Jersey
Baseball coaches from New Jersey
Ocean Vikings baseball coaches
Saint Peter's Peacocks baseball coaches
Saint Peter's Peacocks baseball players
Temple Owls baseball coaches
Toms River High School North alumni
Minor league baseball coaches
Minor league baseball managers